Samuel Thomas Baird (May 5, 1861 – April 22, 1899) was a U.S. Representative from Louisiana.

Born in Oak Ridge, Morehouse Parish, Louisiana, Baird was educated under private tutors and attended the Vincennes (Indiana) University.
He studied law.
He was admitted to the bar in 1882 and commenced practice in Bastrop, Morehouse Parish, Louisiana.
He served as district attorney of the sixth judicial district 1884-1888.
He served as district judge of the sixth judicial district 1888-1892.
He resumed the practice of law in Bastrop.
He served as member of the State senate in 1896.
He served as delegate to the Democratic National Convention at Chicago in 1896.

Baird was elected as a Democrat to the Fifty-fifth and Fifty-sixth Congresses and served from March 4, 1897, until his death in Washington, D.C., April 22, 1899.
He was interred in Christ Church Cemetery, Bastrop, Louisiana.

See also
List of United States Congress members who died in office (1790–1899)

References

1861 births
1899 deaths
Louisiana state court judges
Democratic Party Louisiana state senators
Democratic Party members of the United States House of Representatives from Louisiana
19th-century American politicians
19th-century American judges